Rodrigue Yves Fassinou (born 22 May 1999) is a Beninese international footballer who plays for ASPAC, as a midfielder.

In May 2019, he was named in Benin's squad for the 2019 Africa Cup of Nations.

References

1999 births
Living people
Beninese footballers
Benin international footballers
ASPAC FC players
Association football midfielders
2019 Africa Cup of Nations players